Shao Ting (born 10 December 1989) is a Chinese basketball player for the Beijing Great Wall and the Chinese national team, where she participated at the 2014 FIBA World Championship. After playing in China, Ting was an undrafted free agent for the Lynx out of her country in 2017.

She is currently pursuing a Doctor of Philosophy degree in education at Beijing Normal University.

WNBA career statistics

Regular season

|-
| align="left" | 2019
| align="left" | Minnesota
| 5 || 0 || 5.4 || .200 || .000 || .667 || 1.2 || 0.4 || 0.0 || 0.2 || 0.4 || 1.2
|-
| align="left" | Career
| align="left" | 1 year, 1 team
| 5 || 0 || 5.4 || .200 || .000 || .667 || 1.2 || 0.4 || 0.0 || 0.2 || 0.4 || 1.2

References

External links

1989 births
Living people
Chinese women's basketball players
Small forwards
Basketball players at the 2016 Summer Olympics
Basketball players at the 2020 Summer Olympics
Olympic basketball players of China
Basketball players from Shanghai
Beijing Normal University alumni
Asian Games medalists in basketball
Basketball players at the 2018 Asian Games
Asian Games gold medalists for China
Medalists at the 2018 Asian Games
Beijing Great Wall players
Minnesota Lynx players